Richard C. Koo (born 1954) is a Taiwanese-American economist living in Japan specializing in balance sheet recessions. He is Chief Economist at the Nomura Research Institute.

Early life and education
Koo was born in Kobe. His father, Koo Kwang-ming, was an activist in the Taiwan independence movement then living in exile in Japan, and the brother of the prominent Taiwanese businessman Koo Chen-fu. Koo lived in Tokyo for 13 years in his youth, and later attended the University of California, Berkeley where he received a BA degree in Political Science and Government in 1976. He then proceeded to Johns Hopkins University for graduate school, where he received an MA degree in 1981.

Career
Upon graduation from Johns Hopkins University, Koo worked at the Federal Reserve Bank of New York as an economist from 1981 to 1984.

He then joined Nomura in 1984 as its first expatriate researcher - first as senior economist from 1984 to 1997. He later became the chief economist at Nomura Research Institute starting in 1997.

Landon Thomas wrote about Koo's analysis in late 2011 in the New York Times, saying that Koo's 2011 "causes, cure, and politics" publication "has gone viral on the Web". Thomas was discussing the divergence between the way the U.S. and British governments addressed their banking crises in the 2008-9 financial crisis and the way Europe was beginning to in late 2011.

Publications 
  (2008)  The Holy Grail of Macroeconomics - Lessons from Japan’s Great Recession (John Wiley & Sons)
 (2011) "The world in balance sheet recession: causes, cure, and politics", Real-World Economics Review (issue no. 58), Nomura Research Institute, Tokyo.
 (2014) The Escape from Balance Sheet Recession and the QE Trap: A Hazardous Road for the World Economy (John Wiley & Sons)

References

External links
Some of Koo's videos and links are below:

Links
Profile at the Institute for New Economic Thinking

Videos

  at the Institute for New Economic Thinking's (INET) Paradigm Lost Conference in Berlin. April 14, 2012

Living people
1954 births
Taiwanese people of Hoklo descent
Hokkien businesspeople
American people of Chinese descent
American expatriates in Japan
Koo family of Lukang
Institute for New Economic Thinking
Johns Hopkins University alumni
University of California, Berkeley alumni
Japanese economists
21st-century American economists
Federal Reserve economists
Nomura Holdings